Historical Atlas of the World is a historical atlas that contains 108 color maps showing religious boundaries, countries, cities, buildings army movements and expeditions.  It contains an index to place, peoples, historical and military events and explorers.  Covers the span from 3000 BC to ~1970 (Rhodesia, not Zimbabwe; Pakistan, not Bangladesh; North and South Vietnam)

Broken into four sections:
 Ancient Times (3000 BC – 200 AD):  31 maps
 The Middles Ages (200–1500): 24 maps
 Recent Times (1500–1900): 38 maps
 Twentieth Century (1900–1970): 15 maps

There is no commentary on the maps, but nearly all maps have a thorough legend.  Occasionally a map will have an unreferenced symbol.

Compact (0.5" x 4.75"x 7.75") and tightly bound.

Last known printing: 1981

1962 non-fiction books
W